National Highway 162A, commonly called NH 162A is a national highway in  India. It is a spur road of National Highway 162. NH-162A traverses the state of Rajasthan in India.

Route 
Mavli - Fatehnagar - Dariba - Railmagra - Khandel.

Junctions  
 
  Terminal near Mavli.
  Terminal near Khandel.

See also 
 List of National Highways in India
 List of National Highways in India by state

References

External links 

 NH 162A on OpenStreetMap

National highways in India
National Highways in Rajasthan